Buena Park is a city in Orange County, California, United States.

Buena Park may also refer to:
Buena Park station, a commuter rail station in Buena Park, California
Buena Park, Chicago, Illinois
Buena Park, Wisconsin, an unincorporated community